5I or 5-I can refer to:

IATA code for Air G, also called Transair Georgia
Amos-5i, an AsiaSat 2 satellite
SSH 5I (WA), see Washington State Route 510

See also
I5 (disambiguation)
C5I, a military acronym
Five Eyes, an intelligence alliance